HFLS3 is the name for a distant galaxy at z = 6.34, originating about 880 million years after the Big Bang. Its discovery was announced on 18 April 2013 as an exceptional starburst galaxy producing nearly 3,000 solar masses of stars a year. It was found using the far-infrared-capable Herschel Space Telescope. The galaxy was estimated to have 35 billion stars. It is 10–30 times the mass of other known galaxies at such an early time in the universe.

HFLS3 was subjected to a follow-up campaign by other telescopes due to its high redness. It was found in the HerMES campaign, which also found other very red sources.

See also
List of the most distant astronomical objects

References

External links
HFLS3 – a record-breaking galaxy

Study of the	environmentof HFLS3 an extremestarburst at z=6.34 (.pdf)

Starburst galaxies
Draco (constellation)